The men's 200 metre individual medley competition at the 2014 Pan Pacific Swimming Championships took place on August 24 at the Gold Coast Aquatic Centre.  The last champion was Ryan Lochte of US.

This race consisted of four lengths of the pool, one each in backstroke, breaststroke, butterfly and freestyle swimming.

Records
Prior to this competition, the existing world and Pan Pacific records were as follows:

Results
All times are in minutes and seconds.

Heats
The first round was held on August 24, at 10:42.

B Final 
The B final was held on August 24, at 20:24.

A Final 
The A final was held on August 24, at 20:24.

References

2014 Pan Pacific Swimming Championships